Karlsruhe is a city in southern Germany.

Karlsruhe may also refer to:

Places
 Karlsruhe (district), a rural district (Landkreis) in the north-west of Baden-Württemberg, Germany
 Karlsruhe (region), one of the four administrative regions (Regierungsbezirk) of Baden-Württemberg, Germany, located in the north-west of the state
 Karlsruhe, North Dakota, a town in the United States founded by German-Russians
 Karlsruhe, a German-Russian village established by German immigrants in what is now Stepove, Mykolaiv Raion, Ukraine
 Transmission site Landespolizeidirektion Karlsruhe, a radio transmission site near Stuttgart, Germany

In rail transport
 Karlsruhe model, a type of train system with different types of trains running on the same track
 Karlsruhe Stadtbahn, a German tram-train system
 Karlsruhe Hauptbahnhof, a railway station in the city of Karlsruhe
 Karlsruhe Local Railway, a former metre-gauge light railway
 Maschinenbau-Gesellschaft Karlsruhe, a defunct locomotive and railway wagon manufacturer
 Karlsruhe (EMU), class 425 electric multiple unit of Rhine-Neckar S-Bahn

Ships
 , a passenger steamer for North German Lloyd; sold 1908
 , a cargo steamer for Hamburg America Line; torpedoed and sunk in 1945
 Karlsruhe, the name from 1928  of the former , a passenger steamer for North German Lloyd; scrapped 1932
 , World War I German light cruiser, launched 1912
 , Königsberg class light cruiser, launched 1916
 ,  7,200 ton K class light cruiser, sunk World War II 
 , Köln-class frigate, launched 1959, decommissioned 1983
 ,  Bremen-class (Type 122) frigate, launched 1982, decommissioned 2017
  (F267), Braunschweig-class (Type 130) corvette, under construction, laid down 2020
 Ersatz Karlsruhe, a  World War I cruiser

In sports
 Karlsruher SC, a football club
 Karlsruher FV, a football club
 BG Karlsruhe, a basketball club
 Post Südstadt Karlsruhe, a sports club
 Karlsruhe Storm, a lacrosse team

Other uses
 Karlsruhe Accurate Arithmetic (KAA), an approach to high-accuracy computation in computer sciences
 Karlsruhe Congress, an international scientific meeting in 1860
 Karlsruhe metric, a measure of distance
 Karlsruhe Nuclide Chart, a table of nuclides (atomic species)
 Weltklasse in Karlsruhe, an annual indoor track and field competition

See also
 Carlsruhe (disambiguation)
 List of German cruisers named Karlsruhe